The Tianhuaban Dam is an arch dam on the Niulan River, a tributary of the Jinsha River. It straddles the border of Ludian and Qiaojia Counties in Yunnan Province, China. The primary purpose of the dam is hydroelectric power generation and it supports a 180 MW power station. In September 2006, construction on the dam's river diversion tunnels commenced. The first two of 90 MW Francis turbine-generator sets was commissioned in February 2011, the second in March of the same year.

See also

List of dams and reservoirs in China 
List of tallest dams in China

References

Dams in China
Arch dams
Dams completed in 2011
Buildings and structures in Zhaotong
Hydroelectric power stations in Yunnan
Energy infrastructure completed in 2011
2011 establishments in China
Roller-compacted concrete dams